The International Journal on Semantic Web and Information Systems (IJSWIS) is a quarterly peer-reviewed academic journal covering the semantic web and information systems. It was established in 2005 and is published by IGI Global. The editor-in-chief are Miltiadis D. Lytras (The American College of Greece, Greece) and Brij Gupta (National Institute of Technology, Kurukshetra, India).

Abstracting and indexing
The journal is abstracted and indexed in:

References

External links

Publications established in 2005
English-language journals
Quarterly journals
Semantic Web and Information Systems, International Journal on
Computer science journals
Semantic Web
Information systems journals